This article contains a list of current SNCF railway stations in the Hauts-de-France region of France.

Aisne (02)

 Aguilcourt—Variscourt
 Amifontaine
 Anizy-Pinon
 Barenton-Bugny
 Bazoches
 Bohain
 La Bouteille
 Château-Thierry
 Chauny
 Chézy-sur-Marne
 Clacy-Mons
 Corcy
 Coucy-lès-Eppes
 Crépy-Couvron
 Crouy
 Dercy-Froidmont
 La Fère
 La Ferté-Milon
 Flavy-le-Martel
 Fresnoy-le-Grand
 Guignicourt
 Hirson
 Hirson-Écoles
 Laon
 Longpont
 Margival
 Marle-sur-Serre
 Mennessis
 Montescourt
 Nogent-l'Artaud-Charly
 Origny-en-Thiérache
 Saint-Erme
 Saint-Quentin
 Soissons
 Tergnier
 Vaumoise
 Vauxaillon
 Verneuil-sur-Serre
 Versigny
 Vervins
 Vierzy
 Villers-Cotterêts
 Viry-Noureuil
 Voyenne

Nord (59)

 Annappes
 Anor
 Arleux
 Armentiéres
 Arnèke
 Ascq
 Aubigny-au-Bac
 Aulnoye-Aymeries
 Avesnelles
 Avesnes-sur-Helpe
 Bailleul
 Baisieux
 La Bassée-Violaines
 Bauvin-Provin
 Bergues
 Berlaimont
 Bertry
 Beuvrages
 Les Bons-Pères
 Bouchain
 Bourbourg
 Brunémont
 Busigny
 Cambrai-Annexe
 Cambrai
 Cantin
 Cassel
 Le Cateau
 Cattenières
 Caudry
 Coudekerque-Branche
 Croix-l'Allumette
 Croix-Wasquehal
 Denain
 Dompierre
 Don-Sainghin
 Douai
 Dunkerque
 Ebblinghem
 Ennevelin
 Escaudœuvres
 Esquelbecq
 La Fontaine
 Fourmies
 Fretin
 Grande-Synthe
 Gravelines
 Hachette
 Haubourdin
 Hautmont
 Hazebrouck
 Hellemmes
 Iwuy
 Jeumont
 Landas
 Landrecies
 Lesquin
 Leval
 Lezennes
 Lille-CHR
 Lille-Europe
 Lille-Flandres
 Lille-Porte-de-Douai
 Loos
 Lourches
 Louvroil
 La Madeleine
 Marquillies
 Maubeuge
 Maurois
 Mont-de-Terre
 Montigny-en-Ostrevent
 Nieppe
 Nomain
 Orchies
 Ors
 Ostricourt
 Pérenchies
 Phalempin
 Le Poirier-Université
 Pont-de-Bois
 Pont-de-la-Deule
 Prouvy-Thiant
 Le Quesnoy
 Raismes
 Recquignies
 Renescure
 Ronchin
 Rosult
 Roubaix
 Sains-du-Nord
 Saint-Amand-les-Eaux
 Saint-André
 Saint-Hilaire
 Salomé
 Santes
 Seclin
 Sin-le-Noble
 Somain
 Sous-le-Bois
 Steenbecque
 Steenwerck
 Strazeele
 Templeuve
 Thiennes
 Tourcoing
 Trith-Saint-Léger
 Valenciennes
 Wallers
 Wambaix
 Wattignies-Templemars
 Wavrin

Oise (60)

 Abancourt
 Appilly
 Avrechy
 Balagny-Saint-Épin
 Beauvais
 Boran-sur-Oise
 Bornel—Belle-Église
 Breteuil
 Breteuil-Embranchement
 Chambly
 Chantilly-Gouvieux
 Chaumont-au-Vexin
 Chevrières
 Choisy-au-Bac
 Cires-lès-Mello
 Clermont-de-l'Oise
 Compiègne
 Cramoisy
 Creil
 Crépy-en-Valois
 Esches
 Estrées-Saint-Denis
 Feuquières-Broquiers
 Formerie
 Fouilloy
 Gannes
 Grandvilliers
 Heilles-Mouchy
 Herchies
 Hermes-Berthecourt
 Jaux
 Laboissière-Le Déluge
 Laigneville
 Lavilletertre
 Liancourt-Saint-Pierre
 Liancourt-Rantigny
 Longueil-Annel
 Longueil-Sainte-Marie
 Mareuil-sur-Ourcq
 Marseille-en-Beauvaisis
 Méru
 Meux
 Milly-sur-Thérain
 Montataire
 Montreuil-sur-Thérain
 Mouy-Bury
 Nanteuil-le-Haudouin
 Noyon
 Ormoy-Villers
 Orry-la-Ville-Coye
 Ourscamps
 Le Plessis-Belleville
 Pont-l'Évêque-sur-Oise
 Pont-Sainte-Maxence
 Précy-sur-Oise
 Rémy
 Ribécourt
 Rieux-Angicourt
 Rochy-Condé
 Saint-Just-en-Chaussée
 Saint-Leu-d'Esserent
 Saint-Omer-en-Chaussée
 Saint-Rémy-en-l'Eau
 Saint-Sulpice-Auteuil
 Sérifontaine
 Thourotte
 Tricot
 Trie-Château
 Villers-Saint-Paul
 Villers-Saint-Sépulcre
 Wacquemoulin

Pas-de-Calais (62)

 Achiet
 Anvin
 Arras
 Aubigny-en-Artois
 Aubin-Saint-Vaast
 Auchy-lès-Hesdin
 Audruicq
 Avion
 Bailleul-Sir-Berthoult
 Beau-Marais
 Beaurainville
 Béthune
 Beuvry
 Biache-Saint-Vaast
 Billy-Montigny
 Blangy-sur-Ternoise
 Boisleux
 Boulogne-Tintelleries
 Boulogne-Ville
 Brebières-Sud
 Brimeux
 Bully-Grenay
 Caffiers
 Calais-Fréthun
 Calais-Ville
 Calonne-Ricouart
 Chocques
 Corbehem
 Coron-de-Méricourt
 Courcelles-le-Comte
 Cuinchy
 Dannes-Camiers
 Dourges
 Étaples-Le Touquet
 Farbus
 Les Fontinettes
 Fouqeureuil
 Frévin-Capelle
 Ham-en-Artois
 Le Haut-Banc
 Hénin-Beaumont
 Hesdigneul
 Hesdin
 Isbergues
 Leforest
 Lens
 Libercourt
 Liévin
 Lillers
 Loison-sous-Lens
 Loos-en-Gohelle
 Maresquel
 Marœuil
 Marquillies
 Marquise-Rinxent
 Mazingarbe
 Meurchin
 Montreuil-sur-Mer
 Neufchätel-Hardelot
 Nœux-les-Mines
 Nortkerque
 Pernes-Camblain
 Pihen
 Pont-à-Vendin
 Pont-d'Ardres
 Pont-de-Briques
 Pont-de-Sallaumines
 Rang-du-Fliers
 Rœux
 Ruminghem
 Saint-Omer
 Saint-Pol-sur-Ternoise
 Sallaumines
 Savy-Berlette
 Tincques
 Vimy
 Vis-à-Marles
 Vitry-en-Artois
 Watten-Éperlecques
 Wimille-Wimereux

Somme (80)

 Abbeville
 Ailly-sur-Noye
 Ailly-sur-Somme
 Albert
 Amiens
 Boves
 Buire-sur-l'Ancre
 Chaulnes
 Corbie
 Daours
 Dommartin-Remiencourt
 Dreuil-lès-Amiens
 La Faloise
 Ham (Somme)
 Hangest
 Hargicourt—Pierrepont
 TGV Haute-Picardie
 Heilly
 Longpré-les-Corps-Saints
 Longueau
 Marcelcave
 Méricourt-Ribémont
 Miraumont
 Montdidier
 Moreuil
 Namps-Quevauvillers
 Nesle (Somme)
 Noyelles
 Picquigny
 Poix-de-Picardie
 Pont-Remy
 Rosières
 Rue
 Saint-Roch (Somme)
 Thézy-Glimont
 Villers-Bretonneux

See also
 SNCF 
 List of SNCF stations for SNCF stations in other regions

Hauts-de-France